Eichorn is an unincorporated community in Hardin County, Illinois, United States. Eichorn is located on Illinois Route 34, northwest of Rosiclare.

The community bears the name of Martin Eichorn, a German settler who owned a general store with a post office. The postal service requested a name for the town so Eichorn was picked for the name.

References

Unincorporated communities in Hardin County, Illinois
Unincorporated communities in Illinois